The 2011 ANZAC Test was a rugby league test match played between Australia and New Zealand on 6 May 2011 at Skilled Park on the Gold Coast. Australia won their tenth straight Anzac test with a score of 20–10.

Pre-game

The game was originally scheduled to be played in AMI Stadium in Christchurch but was moved because of the damages from the 2011 Canterbury earthquake. However, 250 earthquake victims and volunteer workers were flown in for the match. to be commemorated.

New Zealand were given a chance by some pundits considering that they had beaten Australia in the 2008 Rugby League World Cup Final and in the 2010 Four Nations. Winning the Anzac test was seen as the one achievement that alluded the New Zealand team. However, Australia went into the match as favorites, having won the last nine Anzac Tests and having never lost to New Zealand in an Anzac Test in Australia. The odds for an Australian win opened at $1.35 but dropped to $1.22 while New Zealand was paying $4.25.

The New Zealand national anthem was performed by J.Williams.

Squads

*Replaced originally selected David Shillington who withdrew due to injury.

Match summary

New Zealand were criticized after the game for their unforgiving error rate, most notably for a period in the second half where five consecutive New Zealand errors allowed Australia to score two tries to secure their win. New Zealand coach Stephen Kearney said after the game "It seems a bit same old, same old – but I know we're taking steps in the right direction. The effort of the guys to keep hanging in there was a real positive.'  New Zealand had at least proved that they could be competitive with Australia again.

See also

References

External links

Anzac Test
Anzac Test
Anzac Test
Rugby league on the Gold Coast, Queensland
International rugby league competitions hosted by Australia
May 2011 sports events in Australia